Alangium polyosmoides is a rainforest tree of eastern Australia. It occurs on a variety of different soils, generally close to the coast. Found from Minmi near Newcastle to as far north as the McIlwraith Range in far north eastern Australia. It may be seen as a common understorey plant at Wingham Brush Nature Reserve.

Common names include muskwood, black muskheart, brown muskheart and canary muskheart. The generic name is from the Malabar people, being their name of the related Asian species, Alangium decapetalum. The specific epithet means "hairy". The subspecies name refers to the similarity of the leaves in the genus Polyosma.

Description
A small to occasionally mid-sized tree. The trunk in larger trees may be buttressed. The bark is marked by lenticels, scales and corky bumps and irregularities, mostly greyish brown in colour. Small branches thin and grey, though hairy and green towards the end. In this subspecies, the twig between the leaves is not particularly hairy.

Mature leaves are from 4 to 15 cm (1.4–6 in) long and 2 to 4 cm (0.8-1.6 in) wide, though juveniles may be larger. Alternate on the stem with a fairly long point. Leaves shaped oblong-ovate or oblong-elliptical. Unequal at the leaf base. Midrib, lateral veins and net veins evident from below the leaf. As are numerous yellow coloured bumps along the lateral veins and mid rib. This makes identification of this plant very clear, when in the rainforest. Leaf stem 6 to 13 mm long.

Flowers and fruit

Pale yellow flowers form on cymes from the leaf axils. Three to five flowers per cyme, the flowers have a honeysuckle scent. The cyme is less than 2 cm long, which appears from October to April. 4 to 6 petals per flower, 2 mm wide and around 5 mm long.

The fruit is a dark drupe, black or almost black. Ribbed and oval, 10 to 20 mm long. Fruit ripens from September to February and is eaten by rainforest birds, including the rose-crowned fruit-dove, topknot pigeon and wompoo fruit-dove. Inside the fruit is an elliptic shaped, pointed seed, 10 mm long.

References

polyosmoides
Endemic flora of Australia
Flora of New South Wales
Flora of Queensland
Asterids of Australia
Trees of Australia